Interstate 20 (I-20) is a part of the Interstate Highway System that spans  from Reeves County, Texas, to Florence, South Carolina. Within the state of Louisiana, the highway travels  from the Texas state line west of Greenwood to the Mississippi River, which it crosses into Vicksburg, Mississippi.

I-20 traverses the northern portion of the state, serving the metropolitan areas of Shreveport–Bossier City and Monroe, as well as the smaller cities of Minden and Ruston. It entirely parallels the older U.S. Highway 80 (US 80) corridor through Louisiana. The route is mirrored by I-10, which traverses the southern portion of the state. The two are connected by I-49, the state's major north–south Interstate Highway.

Route description
I-20 passes through Greenwood to the north of town, where US 80/US 79 serve as the main east–west highway. I-20 intersects I-220 (the north Shreveport bypass) and Louisiana Highway 3132 (LA 3132, the south Shreveport bypass) on the westside of the city. On the way to Downtown Shreveport, I-20 intersects US 171 and serves as the current northern terminus of I-49. 

As I-20 leaves Shreveport, it passes through Bossier City where it shares an overlap with US 71. I-20 passes north of Barksdale AFB where it intersects I-220 and heads east toward Monroe. On its way to Monroe, I-20 traverses mainly rural, hilly terrain as it passes through the towns of; Minden, Arcadia, Grambling, Ruston (where it intersects US 167), and West Monroe. 

I-20 passes through Monroe, where it intersects US 165. East of Monroe, I-20 enters flatter terrain as it passes through Rayville, Delhi, and Tallulah.

Exit list

Auxiliary routes

Interstate 220 

Interstate 220 (I-220) in Louisiana is an east–west bypass route around Shreveport, in the northwestern corner of the state. It runs  from I-20 and Louisiana Highway 3132 (LA 3132) in Shreveport to a second interchange with I-20 in Bossier City. The highway serve as a northern bypass of the downtown area for through traffic traveling on I-20, and, with LA 3132, the highway helps to carry through traffic between the two currently disconnected portions of I-49, the area's main north–south route.

Interstate 420

Interstate 420 (I-420) was to be a bypass of Monroe, Louisiana. Initially proposed in the late 1950s, this route was to have been only two lanes wide at a cost $29 million with a projected 2,500 to 3,000 ADT in 1964. The project was effectively canceled on October 12, 1964, when then Louisiana Representative Hale Boggs agreed to no longer seek funding for the route. This was done in favor of focusing all efforts at funding and getting built New Orleans' Vieux Carré Riverfront Expressway.

Notes

References

External links

Maps / GIS Data Homepage, Louisiana Department of Transportation and Development

 Louisiana
20
Transportation in Bienville Parish, Louisiana
Transportation in Bossier Parish, Louisiana
Transportation in Caddo Parish, Louisiana
Transportation in Lincoln Parish, Louisiana
Transportation in Madison Parish, Louisiana
Transportation in Ouachita Parish, Louisiana
Transportation in Richland Parish, Louisiana
Transportation in Webster Parish, Louisiana